Y Tyst a'r Dydd was a weekly Welsh language newspaper established in 1871 as a result of the merger of Y Dydd' and Tyst Cymreig.

The newspaper was distributed throughout Wales and also in the Liverpool area. It contained general local, national, and international news. Associated titles: Tyst Cymreig (1867-1870); Y Tyst (1892- ); Y Dydd (1868-1954).

References

Newspapers published in Wales
Publications established in 1871